HDMS Najaden was a frigate in the Royal Danish-Norwegian Navy. She was commissioned in 1811 and originally carried 36 guns, later being upgraded to 42. She served briefly during the Gunboat War only seeing action once, when on 6 July 1812 the British ship of the line  and the   sank her during the Battle of Lyngør. The Battle of Lyngør effectively ended Denmark's involvement in the Napoleonic Wars.

Origin
During their occupation of Copenhagen in 1807, the British destroyed a partially built ship-of-the-line  by hacking away the supports so that the ship fell on its port side, which crushed most of its timbers.  The starboard side was essentially intact however, and the Danes used these timbers to build a new frigate – the Najaden.

Career
During her entire short life, Najadens  captain was the Danish naval officer Hans Peter Holm. Her maiden voyage on 29 February 1812 (a leap year) had been delayed by one day because the ship grounded whilst leaving Copenhagen harbour. She then dragged an anchor on arrival in Brekkestø, Norway, which led to rudder damage on rocks, which further delayed her entry on active service. Still, on this short voyage the ship had achieved a good average speed of ten knots. Then yet more early storm damage curtailed training of the crew.

Battle of Lyngør

Najadens captain, Hans Peter Holm, also commanded the squadron that consisted of the three brigs - Kiel, Lolland (or Laaland) and Samsøe. Eyeing an opportunity to enforce the blockade and break the back of Dano-Norwegian seapower, the British deployed the 64-gun third-rate ship-of-the-line  and three brigs, the 18-gun Cruizer-class brig-sloop , 14-gun brig-sloop  and the 14-gun gun-brig .

Within 45 minutes of the commencement of the action, Najaden had sunk, having suffered 133 dead and 82 wounded. Captain Holm survived, only to drown in an accident a few months later. The battle resumed as Norwegian gunboats found their way into Lyngør. At 2 a.m. on July 7, Dictator, which had grounded, pulled herself off and departed from the battleifeld. The British took Lolland and Kiel as prizes but had to abandon them after the two vessels grounded. The British did not set fire to either as they still had their crews and wounded aboard. The action cost Dictator five killed and 24 wounded, Calypso three killed, one wounded and two missing, and Flamer one killed and one wounded. Overall, the Danish recorded their losses as 300 men killed or wounded.

Notes

References

External links
Najaden - The Frigate from the Norwegian Marine Museum
The original report from Captain Holm on the loss of Najaden (in Danish)
Individual record cards in Danish for ships of the Danish Royal Navy can sometimes be  (April 2019) found on the internet at Orlogmuseet Skibregister. The Danish Naval Museum is building a new website at which details, drawings and models may be available.  For individual ships already listed, including Najaden, see here .
Record card for the Najaden (1811) in Danish
 Biography of Hans Peter Holm (in Norwegian)
 Model of Najaden (1811)

 

Frigates of the Royal Dano-Norwegian Navy
Maritime incidents in 1812
1811 ships
Ships designed by Frantz Hohlenberg
Ships built in Copenhagen
Shipwrecks in the North Sea
Shipwrecks of Norway